North Cliffe is a hamlet and former civil parish, now in the parish of South Cliffe, in the East Riding of Yorkshire, England. The hamlet bestrides Cliffe Road. On the eastern side lies the houses, and to the west is a small church/chapel. In 1931 the parish had a population of 71.

North Cliffe is the home of The White Rose Polo Club which is a member of the Hurlingham Polo Association.

The parish church, dedicated to St John, is located in North Cliff and was designated a Grade II listed building in 1996 and is now recorded in the National Heritage List for England, maintained by Historic England.

History 
South Cliffe was formerly a township in the parish of Sancton, from 1866 North Cliffe was a civil parish in its own right until 1 April 1935 the parish was abolished and merged with South Cliffe.

Notable residents 

 Samuel Fox, industrialist and businessman, founder of Samuel Fox and Company and Fox Umbrella Frames Ltd at Stocksbridge. Samuel financed St John's church, and was the first to be buried in the churchyard in 1887.

References

External links

Hamlets in the East Riding of Yorkshire
Former civil parishes in the East Riding of Yorkshire